Leo Cooper (born 1922) was a Polish Holocaust survivor and historian at the University of Melbourne. 

Cooper was born in Warsaw, Poland in 1922, and was Jewish.

Works

References

1922 births
Possibly living people
People from Warsaw
Holocaust survivors
Academic staff of the University of Melbourne
Jewish historians
Historians of Russia
Historians of the Soviet Union
Polish emigrants to Australia